The 1998 Euro Beach Soccer League was the first edition of the Euro Beach Soccer League (EBSL), the premier beach soccer competition contested between men's European national teams, originally known as the European Pro Beach Soccer League at the time. The competition was organised by Beach Soccer Company (BSC), the precursors to Beach Soccer Worldwide (BSWW) who took over organisation in 2001, between June 6 and September 20, 1998 in seven different nations across Europe.

The debut season was set up to be a competition with a presence throughout the summer to promote the newly founded sport in Europe through the consistency of a summer-long, professional-level spectacle.

Germany won on the final day of the season, remaining the only time they have won the league title or even finished inside the top four.

Participating teams
Seven teams took part in the inaugural season.

Organisation

Format
Matches were split into seven rounds of fixtures known as stages, with one stage hosted in each of the seven countries participating as shown. Four teams took part in each, three joining the host nation of that particular stage, with each individual team taking part in four of the seven stages overall.

Each stage was played as a small knock-out tournament, with semi finals, the final and a third place decider being the fixtures throughout all seven rounds. Teams earned points for their successes per game and per stage which were then tallied up in the final league table.

The team who topped the table after all seven stages was crowned the winner of the league.

Point distribution
Points were allocated for the following achievements in each stage, contributing to the final points total in the league table.

Stages

Stage 1
The first stage took place in Siracusa, Italy. The hosts won the stage.

Stage 2
The second stage took place in Zürich, Switzerland. Germany won the stage.

Stage 3
The third stage took place in Budva, Montenegro, FR Yugoslavia. France won the stage.

Stage 4
The fourth stage took place in Sant Joan d'Alacant, Spain. Italy claimed their second stage win.

Stage 5
The fifth stage took place in Travemünde, Germany. The hosts won their second stage.

Stage 6
The sixth stage took place in Figueira da Foz, Portugal. These matches were also simultaneously part of the 1998 Mundialito tournament. The hosts won their first stage.

Stage 7
The seventh and final stage took place in Monte Carlo, Monaco. Germany secured the title by beating France in the third place play-off. Portugal won their second stage, the only nation to win two consecutively.

Stage winners

Final Table

Winners

References

Sources
 Roonba
 BSWW

Euro Beach Soccer League
1998 in beach soccer